The Macau International Movie Festival is an international film festival that takes place in Macau, China. The first festival took place between December 26, 2009 and January 2, 2010. It was organized by mainland Chinese businessman Xu Chao Ping.

The festival awards the Golden Lotus Awards.

It is distinct from the International Film Festival & Awards Macao (IFFAM, 澳門國際影展).

Festivals 
 1st Macau International Movie Festival (2009)
 2nd Macau International Movie Festival (2010)
 3rd Macau International Movie Festival (2011)
 4th Macau International Movie Festival (2012)
 5th Macau International Movie Festival (2013)
 6th Macau International Movie Festival (2014)
 7th Macau International Movie Festival (2015)
 8th Macau International Movie Festival (2016)
 9th Macau International Movie Festival (2017)
 10th Macau International Movie Festival (2018)
 11th Macau International Movie Festival (2019)
 12th Macau International Movie Festival (2020)

See also 
 List of film festivals in China

References

External links

Film festivals in China
Festivals in Macau
2009 establishments in Macau
Recurring events established in 2009